Sanjuzan (also Romanized as Sanjūzān and Sanjowzān; also known as Sachūzān) is a village in Korzan Rud Rural District, in the Central District of Tuyserkan County, Hamadan Province, Iran. At the 2006 census, its population was 310, in 93 families.

References 

Populated places in Tuyserkan County